Alten Solar Power Station, also Kesses 1 Solar Power Station, is a  solar power plant under construction in Kenya, the largest economy in the East African Community.

Location

Overview
Kenya has ambitions to electrify 100 percent of the country's population, up from 70 percent in 2017. This development and the 50 megawatts Kopere Solar Power Station, together with the 55 megawatts Garissa Solar Power Station, owned by Kenya Rural Electrification Authority, are aimed to diversify Kenya electricity sources, given the unpredictability of hydro-power in this East African country. This power station is expected to supply 123 GWh of energy annually, enough to meet the energy needs of over 245,000 Kenyan homes.

Developers
The power station is owned by Alten Energías Renovables (Alten Renewable Energy), a European independent power producer with two other solar project developments in Kenya, Kesses 2 and Kopere.

Alten has notified Kenyan authorities that the French company Voltalia was selected by the owners to carry out the construction as the engineering, procurement and construction (EPC) contractor, as well as the operations and maintenance (O&M) contractor for the plant. The power will be sold to electricity distributor Kenya Power and Lighting Company via a 20-year power purchase agreement (PPA).

Funding
Standard Bank of South Africa, Stanbic Bank of Kenya and CIB Bank will jointly provide  syndicated loan of US$41 million. The Emerging Africa Infrastructure Fund (EAIF), of the United Kingdom will lend US$35 million towards his project.

Transmission
The 230kV high voltage transmission line between Turkwel Hydroelectric Power Station and the Kenya Power substation at Lessos, passes over this solar farm. The power generated at this solar farm will be injected into the Kenyan grid at the point where that 230kV line crosses the solar farm.

Construction timeline
Construction started in January 2020, with commissioning expected in late 2021 or early 2022. In September 2022, Afrik21.africa reported that the installation of the power station hardware was complete. After the mandatory performance tests and calibrations, the solar farm is expected to come online during the fourth quarter of 2022.

See also

List of power stations in Kenya
Malindi Solar Power Station
Eldosol Solar Power Station
Radiant Solar Power Station

References

External links
 Voltalia signs power sale contract for 50 MW solar power plant in Kenya As of 30 May 2018.

Solar power stations in Kenya
Uasin Gishu County
Proposed solar power stations in Kenya